Daniel Laurens Barringer (October 1, 1788 – October 16, 1852) was a slave owner and United States Representative from North Carolina between 1825 and 1834.

Born in Cabarrus County, North Carolina, Barringer studied law and practiced in the state capital of Raleigh. He was elected to the North Carolina House of Commons in 1813 and 1814, then again in 1819–1822.

In 1826, he was chosen in a special election to fill the U.S. House seat left vacant by the resignation of Willie P. Mangum. He was elected in regular Congressional elections to four succeeding congresses, serving in the national legislature from December 4, 1826, to March 3, 1835. He ran unsuccessfully for a fourth term in 1834, after which he settled in Shelbyville, Tennessee. After leaving Congress, Barringer became a member of the Tennessee House of Representatives, where he was Speaker from 1843 to 1845; he was a presidential elector for Whig ticket of Henry Clay and Theodore Frelinghuysen. Barringer died in 1852 in Shelbyville, Tennessee.

Barringer was the uncle of Daniel Moreau Barringer, also later a Congressman from North Carolina.

References

1788 births
1852 deaths
Daniel Laurens
People from Cabarrus County, North Carolina
American people of German descent
Jacksonian members of the United States House of Representatives from North Carolina
National Republican Party members of the United States House of Representatives from North Carolina
Tennessee Whigs
1844 United States presidential electors
Members of the North Carolina House of Representatives
Speakers of the Tennessee House of Representatives
People from Shelbyville, Tennessee
People from Raleigh, North Carolina